The National Security Council Deputies Committee (DC) is a committee of the United States National Security Council and the senior sub-Cabinet interagency forum for consideration of national security policy issues by the United States Government.

History
The committee was established in 1989 by incoming president George H. W. Bush, and has been retained in each re-organization of the National Security Council.

Purpose
The Deputies Committee is responsible for reviewing and monitoring the interagency national security process including for establishing and directing the Policy Coordination Committees. The Deputies Committee is convened and chaired by the Deputy National Security Advisor or the Deputy Homeland Security Advisor.

Membership
According to National Security Presidential Memorandum (NSPM-4) of April 2017, regular members of the Deputies Committee are: 

Deputy National Security Advisor (Chair)
Deputy Homeland Security Advisor
Deputy National Security Advisor for Strategy
Deputy Secretary of State 
Deputy Secretary of the Treasury
Deputy Secretary of Defense
Deputy Attorney General
Deputy Secretary of Energy
Deputy Secretary of Homeland Security
Deputy Director of the Office of Management and Budget
Deputy Director of National Intelligence
Vice Chairman of the Joint Chiefs of Staff
National Security Advisor to the Vice President
Administrator of the United States Agency for International Development
Deputy Director of the Central Intelligence Agency. 

Invitations to participant in or attend specific meetings are extended to Deputy or Under Secretary level of executive departments and agencies and to other senior officials when relevant issues are discussed. The Executive Secretary and the Deputy White House Counsel also attend. The relevant Senior Director on the National Security Council staff is also invited to attend when relevant.

References

External links
NSPD-1 - Organization of the National Security Council System, 13 February 2001
 Presidential Memorandum Organization of the National Security Council and the Homeland Security Council

National Security Council Deputies Committee
1989 establishments in the United States